Spin Doctors are an American alternative rock band from New York City, best known for their early 1990s hits "Two Princes" and "Little Miss Can't Be Wrong", which peaked on the Billboard Hot 100 chart at No. 7 and No. 17, respectively.

The band currently consists of Chris Barron (lead vocals), Eric Schenkman (guitar and vocals) and Aaron Comess (drums, bass and keyboards).

History
The group originated in the late 1980s in New York City, originally as a band called Trucking Company; this band included Canadian guitarist Eric Schenkman, harmonicist John Popper, and later vocalist Chris Barron, who was Popper's Princeton, New Jersey high school friend. Popper left this side project to focus on his main gig with Blues Traveler full-time. With a name change to Spin Doctors, as well as the addition of Aaron Comess on drums and Mark White on bass, the classic lineup was in place by the spring of 1989.

Spin Doctors signed with Epic Records/Sony Music A&R executive Frankie LaRocka in 1990. The band's Epic debut EP Up for Grabs...Live was recorded live at the Wetlands Preserve in lower Manhattan, and released in January 1991. (In November 1992, these EP tracks were remixed and supplemented by additional live recordings to form the album Homebelly Groove...Live.) Spin Doctors were known for their somewhat lengthy live shows, sometimes jamming even more than is evident on their live releases. They also often performed double-bill gigs opening for Blues Traveler, with members of both bands all jamming together as the transition from Spin Doctors set into the Blues Traveler set. Spin Doctors have many songs from their early club days that were never officially released, but remain circulated via concert recordings.

Spin Doctors's debut studio album Pocket Full of Kryptonite was released in August 1991. The band continued to play extensive live shows, gaining grassroots fans, as the album was mostly ignored commercially. In the summer of 1992, the band toured with the first lineup of the H.O.R.D.E. festival, sharing the stage with fellow jam bands Widespread Panic, Blues Traveler, and Phish. That summer, commercial popularity heated up, as radio and MTV began playing "Little Miss Can't Be Wrong" and "Two Princes", with the videos directed by filmmaker Rich Murray (who would direct many of the band's videos). The album went Gold in September 1992, and then received another boost in sales after the band's appearance on Saturday Night Live in October 1992. Additional videos and singles followed for "What Time Is It", "How Could You Want Him (When You Know You Could Have Me?)", and "Jimmy Olsen's Blues". By June 1993, the album went Triple Platinum. Ultimately it sold over five million copies in the U.S. and another five million overseas, peaking at No. 3 on the Billboard 200 albums chart.

"[Their] popularity is based on universal rock & roll virtues", said Rolling Stone, which put the band on the cover of its January 7, 1993 issue. "The Doctors aren't trying to blaze new trails. They know we've been down this way with the Stones, Curtis Mayfield, and a few of their other touchstones. But the proof—plenty of it—is in the party." Spin Doctors made an appearance on Sesame Street (episode 3450), singing a modified version of "Two Princes" that emphasized the importance of sharing. In 1993, they recorded covers of "Have You Ever Seen the Rain?", originally by Creedence Clearwater Revival, for the film Philadelphia and "Spanish Castle Magic" for Stone Free: A Tribute to Jimi Hendrix.

Spin Doctors's second studio album, Turn It Upside Down, released in June 1994, was not  as commercially successful as Pocket Full of Kryptonite, although it did sell a million copies in the United States and another million internationally. The second single, "You Let Your Heart Go Too Fast", was a modest hit (No. 42 on the pop chart). The band set out on a three-month headlining tour, and played to large crowds at Woodstock '94 and the Glastonbury Festival. Shortly after the release of Turn It Upside Down, original guitarist Eric Schenkman left the band in September 1994 by walking offstage during a concert in Berkeley, California citing musical and personal differences, and being weary of the road. Schenkman was replaced by Anthony Krizan.

Featuring new guitarist Krizan, Spin Doctors released You've Got to Believe in Something in May 1996. It produced the single and video "She Used to Be Mine". They performed on the Late Show with David Letterman and did some touring, with Ivan Neville joining the band on keyboards. During this period, Spin Doctors contributed the theme song to Seasons 2 and 3 of the television show Spin City. After touring wrapped up in the fall of 1996, Krizan eventually left the band, for reasons that remain relatively unknown. He was replaced by Israeli musician Eran Tabib after auditioning nearly 200 candidates. You've Got to Believe in Something did not live up to previous album sales, selling only 75,000 copies. Epic dropped the band in 1996.

In 1998, Spin Doctors signed to Uptown/Universal and released Here Comes the Bride in June 1999. During the recording of Here Comes the Bride, Mark White left the band. The bass tracks on the album were finished by original band member Aaron Comess. During the tour supporting Here Comes the Bride, Barron lost his voice due to a rare acute form of vocal cord paralysis that severely affected his ability to talk, let alone sing. He was told he had a 50:50 chance of ever talking or singing normally again. Keyboardist Ivan Neville also took over vocal duties for a few dates, but the band eventually cancelled the remainder of its tour. Barron's voice came back in early 2000 (first comeback [solo] shows in March 2000), at which point he began performing with his band and the Give Daddy Five. Barron undertook what he calls "a journeyman songwriting experience", composing tunes with Blues Traveler's John Popper and with former BMI executive Jeff Cohen.
Spin Doctors remained inactive as a band until September 2001, when news about the closing of Wetlands sparked the original four members to reunite. On September 7, 2001, the original lineup took the stage for the first time since 1994 to play at Wetlands. It was the final closing week of the club. The landmark show was a great success for the fans and the band.

Odd shows followed in 2002 through 2005, which eventually led to a brand new studio album, Nice Talking to Me, released on September 13, 2005. The single "Can't Kick the Habit" was included on the soundtrack to the movie Grandma's Boy. It received moderate radio airplay, along with the songs "Margarita" and the title track "Nice Talking to Me". While the record received good reviews, follow-up proved difficult when the record company that released it went out of business.

In 2008, the band continued to play one-off live shows in the United States and Europe. Drummer Aaron Comess released an instrumental record of all his own compositions entitled Catskills Cry featuring bassist Tony Levin and guitarist Bill Dillon. In 2009, Barron released the solo record Pancho and the Kid on Valley Entertainment. During the summer of 2010, Barron released Songs from the Summer of Sangria. This five-song EP was his first official release with his band The Time Bandits.

In 2011, the band celebrated the 20-year anniversary of Pocket Full of Kryptonite with a UK and US tour. Sony Legacy released a 20th anniversary edition with bonus material on August 29, 2011.

In April 2013, the band released If the River Was Whiskey, their sixth studio album.

In January 2022 the band fired longtime bassist Mark White after 33 years over his refusal to receive the COVID-19 vaccine.

Members

Current
Chris Barron – lead and backing vocals, occasional acoustic guitar (1988–1999, 2001–present)
Eric Schenkman – guitars, occasional lead and backing vocals (1988–1994, 2001–present)
Aaron Comess – drums (1988–1999, 2001–present), keyboards (1988–1996, 2001–present), bass (1999, 2022–present), guitar (1999)
Former
Mark White – bass (1988–1998, 2001–2022)
John Popper – harmonica (before name change to Spin Doctors)
Anthony Krizan – guitar, backing vocals (1994–1996)
Ivan Neville – keyboards, backing vocals (1996–1999)
Eran Tabib – guitar, backing vocals (1996–1999)
Carl Carter – bass (1998–1999)

Touring
Shawn Pelton – drums (2012)
Jack Daley – bass (2022)

Timeline

Awards and nominations
American Music Awards of 1994
 Nominated for American Music Award for Favorite Pop/Rock Album for Pocket Full of Kryptonite

36th Grammy Awards
 Nominated for a Grammy Award for Best Rock Performance by a Duo or Group with Vocal for "Two Princes"

Discography

Pocket Full of Kryptonite (1991)
Turn It Upside Down (1994)
You've Got to Believe in Something (1996)
Here Comes the Bride (1999)
Nice Talking to Me (2005)
If the River Was Whiskey (2013)

References

External links
Official site
Spin Doctors videos
Spin Doctors collection at the Internet Archive's live music archive

 
Alternative rock groups from New York (state)
Musical groups established in 1988
Musical groups from New York City
1988 establishments in New York City
Funk rock musical groups
American pop rock music groups